Hüttisheim is a municipality in the district of Alb-Donau in Baden-Württemberg in Germany.

The municipality is a member of the local government association Kirchberg Weihungstal headquartered in Illerkirchberg.

Geography
Hüttisheim lies between the Danube and Iller about 8 km from Laupheim and about 17 km south of Ulm on the river Schmiehe. The hamlet of Humlangen is administratively incorporated into Hüttisheim.

Neighboring communities
The municipality is bordered to the north to the city of Ulm, on the east by Staig and Schnürpflingen in Alb-Donau-Kreis, to the south with the district Bihlafingen the city Laupheim in Biberach district and on the west by Achstetten, also in the district of Biberach.

History
Hüttisheim is first mentioned in a document dated 1152 as "Hittinishaim" confirming the rights of Rot an der Rot Abbey of some property in the village. Through donations both Rot an der Rot Abbey and Wiblingen Abbey were in possession of the village. From about 1450 the entire village was, however, owned by Wiblingen Abbey until the monastery's dissolution in 1806. During the German Peasants' War the village was burnt down in 1525.
High justice remained  with the Count of Kirchberg, the founders of Wiblingen Abbey. The crosier in the coat-of-arms of Hüttisheim represents the almost four hundred years of being ruled by the abbey.

Politics

Council
The last local elections ( municipal council, county council ) for a term of five years was on June 7 of 2009.

Mayor
1945-1946 Frau von Borowsky
1948-1986 Matthew Merz (1921-2003)
1986-2002 Frieder Ehni
2002-2004 Bernd Porter (independent) from Laupheim
2004-2006 is the mayoralty vacant
2006-2014 Stefan Gert Hofer ( CDU )
Since June 2006 Hüttisheim has no full-time mayor any more. The Hüttisheimer IT manager Stefan Gert Hofer was the first time volunteer (part-time) mayor

Things

Regular events
Annually plays the theater group of the Musikverein Hüttisheim in the town hall. Information about the performances can be found on the homepage of the Musikverein. The Garden Party in Humlangen has a long tradition and is also aligned by the Musikverein. The garden party always takes place at Corpus instead.
Since 2005, a village festival takes place, in which actions are offered in several farmsteads situation.

Economy and Infrastructure

Transportation

Education
Kindergarten "Little Rascals " 
Primary school

Personality

Freeman
1986 Mayor Matthew Merz

References
Hochspringen ↑ Population development in the municipalities of Baden-Württemberg in 2014 (Forwarded official population figures) ( help to ).

External links
Commons: Hüttisheim - collection of images, videos and audio files
Wikisource: Hüttisheim in the description of the Oberamts Laupheim from 1856 - sources and full texts
Website the municipality

References

Alb-Donau-Kreis
Württemberg